The Empire of Japan committed war crimes in many Asian-Pacific countries during the period of Japanese imperialism, primarily during the Second Sino-Japanese and Pacific Wars. These incidents have been described as "the Asian Holocaust". Some war crimes were committed by Japanese military personnel during the late 19th century, but most were committed during the first part of the Shōwa era, the name given to the reign of Emperor Hirohito.

Under Emperor Hirohito, the Imperial Japanese Army (IJA) and the Imperial Japanese Navy (IJN) perpetrated numerous war crimes which resulted in the deaths of millions of people. Estimates of the number of deaths range from three to 30 million through massacres, human experimentation, starvation, and forced labor directly perpetrated or condoned by the Japanese military and government. Japanese veterans have admitted war crimes and have provided oral testimonies and written evidence, which includes diaries and war journals.

Airmen of the Imperial Japanese Army Air Service and Imperial Japanese Navy Air Service were not charged as war criminals because there was no positive or specific customary international humanitarian law that prohibited the unlawful conduct of aerial warfare either before or during World War II. The Imperial Japanese Army Air Service took part in conducting chemical and biological attacks on civilians during the Second Sino-Japanese War and World War II. The use of such weapons was generally prohibited by international agreements previously signed by Japan, including the Hague Conventions (1899 and 1907), which banned the use of "poison or poisoned weapons" in warfare.

Since the 1950s, senior Japanese government officials have issued numerous apologies for the war crimes. Japan's Ministry of Foreign Affairs acknowledges Japan's role in causing "tremendous damage and suffering" during World War II, especially during the IJA's entrance into Nanjing, during which Japanese soldiers killed a large number of non-combatants and engaged in looting and rape. However, some members of the Liberal Democratic Party in the Japanese government, such as the former prime ministers Junichiro Koizumi and Shinzō Abe, have prayed at the Yasukuni Shrine; this has been the subject of controversy, as the shrine honours all Japanese who died during the war, including convicted Class A war criminals. Some Japanese history textbooks offer only brief references to the war crimes, and members of the Liberal Democratic Party have denied some of the atrocities, such as government involvement in abducting women to serve as "comfort women", a euphemism for sex slaves.

Definitions

The Tokyo Charter defines war crimes as "violations of the laws or customs of war," which includes crimes against enemy combatants and enemy non-combatants. War crimes also included deliberate attacks on citizens and property of neutral states as they fall under the category of non-combatants, as in the case of the attack on Pearl Harbor.

Military personnel from the Empire of Japan have been convicted of committing many such acts during the period of Japanese imperialism from the late 19th to mid-20th centuries. Japanese military soldiers conducted a series of human rights abuses against civilians and prisoners of war throughout East Asia and the western Pacific region. These events reached their height during the Second Sino-Japanese War of 1937–45 and the Asian and Pacific campaigns of World War II (1941–45).

International and Japanese law

Japan signed the 1929 Geneva Convention on the Prisoners of War and the 1929 Geneva Convention on the Sick and Wounded, but the Japanese government declined to ratify the POW Convention. In 1942, the Japanese government stated that it would abide by the terms of the Convention mutatis mutandis ('changing what has to be changed'). The crimes committed also fall under other aspects of international and Japanese law. For example, many of the crimes committed by Japanese personnel during World War II broke Japanese military law, and were subject to court martial, as required by that law. The Empire also violated international agreements signed by Japan, including provisions of the Hague Conventions (1899 and 1907) such as protections for prisoners of war and a ban on the use of chemical weapons, the 1930 Forced Labour Convention which prohibited forced labor, the 1921 International Convention for the Suppression of the Traffic in Women and Children which prohibited human trafficking, and other agreements. The Japanese government also signed the Kellogg-Briand Pact (1929), thereby rendering its actions in 1937–45 liable to charges of crimes against peace, a charge that was introduced at the Tokyo Trials to prosecute "Class A" war criminals. "Class B" war criminals were those found guilty of war crimes per se, and "Class C" war criminals were those guilty of crimes against humanity. The Japanese government also accepted the terms set by the Potsdam Declaration (1945) after the end of the war, including the provision in Article 10 of punishment for "all war criminals, including those who have visited cruelties upon our prisoners".
Japanese law does not define those convicted in the post-1945 trials as criminals, despite the fact that Japan's governments have accepted the judgments made in the trials, and in the Treaty of San Francisco (1952). Former Prime Minister Shinzō Abe had advocated the position that Japan accepted the Tokyo tribunal and its judgements as a condition for ending the war, but that its verdicts have no relation to domestic law. According to Abe, those convicted of war crimes are not criminals under Japanese law.

Historical and geographical extent

Outside Japan, different societies use widely different timeframes when they define Japanese war crimes. For example, the annexation of Korea by Japan in 1910 was enforced by the Japanese military, and the Society of Yi Dynasty Korea was switched to the political system of the Empire of Japan. Thus, North and South Korea both refer to "Japanese war crimes" as events which occurred during the period of Korea under Japanese rule.

By comparison, the Western Allies did not come into a military conflict with Japan until 1941, and North Americans, Australians, South East Asians and Europeans may consider "Japanese war crimes" to be events that occurred from 1942–1945.

Japanese war crimes were not always carried out by ethnic Japanese personnel. A small minority of people in every Asian and Pacific country invaded or occupied by Japan collaborated with the Japanese military, or even served in it, for a wide variety of reasons, such as economic hardship, coercion, or antipathy to other imperialist powers. In addition to Japanese civil and military personnel, Chinese, Koreans, Manchus and Taiwanese who were forced to serve in the military of the Empire of Japan were also found to have committed war crimes as part of the Japanese Imperial Army.

Japan's sovereignty over Korea and Taiwan, in the first half of the 20th century, was recognized by international agreements—the Treaty of Shimonoseki of 1895 and the Japan–Korea Annexation Treaty of 1910—and at the time, they were considered integral parts of the Japanese colonial empire. Under the international law of today, the Japan-Korea Annexation Treaty might be illegal, because the native populations of Korea and Taiwan were not consulted during the signing of them, there was armed resistance to Japan's annexations, and the Japanese may have also committed war crimes when they crushed the resistance.

Background

Japanese militarism, nationalism, imperialism and racism

Militarism, nationalism and racism, especially during Japan's imperialist expansion, had great bearings on the conduct of the Japanese armed forces both before and during the Second World War. After the Meiji Restoration and the collapse of the Tokugawa shogunate, the Emperor became the focus of military loyalty, nationalism and racism. During the so-called "Age of Imperialism" in the late 19th century, Japan followed the lead of other world powers by establishing a colonial empire, an objective which it aggressively pursued.

Unlike many other major powers, Japan never ratified the Geneva Convention of 1929—also known as the Convention relative to the Treatment of Prisoners of War, Geneva 27 July 1929—which was the version of the Geneva Convention that covered the treatment of prisoners of war during World War II. Nevertheless, Japan ratified the Hague Conventions of 1899 and 1907 which contained provisions regarding prisoners of war and an Imperial Proclamation in 1894 stated that Japanese soldiers should make every effort to win the war without violating international laws. According to Japanese historian Yuki Tanaka, Japanese forces during the First Sino-Japanese War released 1,790 Chinese prisoners without harm, once they signed an agreement not to take up arms against Japan if they were released. After the Russo-Japanese War of 1904–1905, all of the 79,367 Russian prisoners who were held by the Japanese were released and they were also paid for the labor which they performed for the Japanese, in accordance with the Hague Convention. Similarly, the behavior of the Japanese military in World War I was at least as humane as that of other militaries which fought during the war, with some German prisoners of the Japanese finding life in Japan so agreeable that they stayed and settled in Japan after the war.

The events of the 1930s and 1940s

By the late 1930s, the rise of militarism in Japan created at least superficial similarities between the wider Japanese military culture and that of Nazi Germany's elite military personnel, such as those in the Waffen-SS. Japan also had a military secret police force within the IJA, known as the Kenpeitai, which resembled the Nazi Gestapo in its role in annexed and occupied countries, but which had existed for nearly a decade before Hitler's own birth.

Perceived failure or insufficient devotion to the Emperor would attract punishment, frequently of the physical kind. In the military, officers would assault and beat men under their command, who would pass the beating all the way down on to the lowest ranks. In POW camps, this meant that prisoners received the worst beatings of all, partly in the belief that such punishments were merely the proper technique to deal with disobedience.

War crimes

The Imperial Japanese Armed Forces during the 1930s and 1940s is often compared to the Wehrmacht of Nazi Germany from 1933 to 1945 because of the sheer scale of destruction and suffering that both of them caused. Much of the controversy regarding Japan's role in World War II revolves around the death rates of prisoners of war and civilians under Japanese occupation. Historian Sterling Seagrave has written that:

According to the findings of the Tokyo Tribunal, the death rate among prisoners of war from Asian countries held by Japan was 27.1%. The death rate of Chinese prisoners of war were much higher because—under a directive ratified on 5 August 1937, by Emperor Hirohito—the constraints of international law on treatment of those prisoners was removed. Only 56 Chinese prisoners of war were released after the surrender of Japan. After 20 March 1943, officers of the Imperial Japanese Navy ordered and encouraged the Navy to execute all prisoners taken at sea.

On May 14, 1943, a Japanese submarine torpedoed the Australian hospital ship, AHS Centaur, sinking it within three minutes and killing 268 of the 332 people on board. The Centaur was painted with red crosses and well lit. The submarine knowingly sank a hospital ship.

According to British historian Mark Felton, "officers of the Imperial Japanese Navy ordered the deliberately sadistic murders of more than 20,000 Allied seamen and countless civilians in cold-blooded defiance of the Geneva Convention." At least 12,500 British sailors and 7,500 Australians were murdered. The Japanese Navy sank Allied merchant and Red Cross vessels, then murdered the survivors floating in the sea or in lifeboats. During Naval landing parties, the Japanese Navy rounded up, raped, then massacred civilians. Some of the victims were fed to sharks, others were killed by sledge-hammer, bayonet, crucifixion, drowning, hanging and beheading.

Attacks on parachutists and downed airmen

As the Battle of Shanghai and Nanjing signaled the beginning of World War II in Asia, fierce air battles raged across China between the airmen of the Chinese Air Force and the Imperial Japanese Navy Air Force and Imperial Japanese Army Air Force, and the Japanese soon gained notoriety for strafing downed airmen trying to descend to safety in their parachutes; the very first recorded act of Japanese fighter pilots strafing downed airmen occurred on 19 September 1937, when Chinese Air Force pilot Lt. Liu Lanqing (劉蘭清) of the 17th Pursuit Squadron, 3rd Pursuit Group flying P-26 Model 281 fighters, was part of an intercept mission against a force of 30 Japanese bombers and fighters attacking Nanjing. Lt. Liu bailed out in his parachute after his plane was shot up and disabled, and while hanging in his parachute during descent, was killed by the Japanese pilots taking turns strafing him; his flight leader, Capt. John Huang Xinrui, tried shooting at those Japanese pilots shooting at the helpless Lt. Liu, but was shot up himself and had to bail out, waiting until the last possible moment to pull his parachute cord to avoid the cruelty of the Japanese pilots. As a result, Chinese and Russian volunteer pilots were all warned about opening their parachutes too early if bailing out of stricken aircraft.

But even after a safe parachute descent, the Japanese still went after downed airmen; on 18 July 1938, Soviet volunteer pilot Valentin Dudonov was hit by an A5M fighter piloted by Nangō Mochifumi, after which Dudonov bailed out in his parachute and landed on a sand bank on Poyang Lake, only to be continuously strafed by another A5M. Dudonov, running in wild zig-zags and eventually hiding underwater in the lake, survived when the Japanese A5M finally departed. When the Americans joined the war in 1941, they too endured many harrowing and tragic war crimes, clarified by and prosecutable under the protocols of the Geneva Convention.

Attacks on neutral powers

Article 1 of the 1907 Hague Convention III – The Opening of Hostilities prohibited the initiation of hostilities against neutral powers "without previous and explicit warning, in the form either of a reasoned declaration of war or of an ultimatum with conditional declaration of war" and Article 2 further stated that "[t]he existence of a state of war must be notified to the neutral Powers without delay, and shall not take effect in regard to them until after the receipt of a notification, which may, however, be given by telegraph." Japanese diplomats intended to deliver the notice to the United States thirty minutes before the attack on Pearl Harbor occurred on 7 December 1941, but it was delivered to the U.S. government an hour after the attack was over. Tokyo transmitted the 5,000-word notification (commonly called the "14-Part Message") in two blocks to the Japanese Embassy in Washington, but transcribing the message took too long for the Japanese ambassador to deliver it in time.

The 14-Part Message was not moreover a declaration of war, but was instead about sending a message to U.S. officials that peace negotiations between Japan and the U.S. were likely to be terminated. Japanese officials were well aware that the 14-Part Message was not a proper declaration of war as required by the 1907 Hague Convention III – The Opening of Hostilities. They decided not to issue a proper declaration of war anyway as they feared that doing so would expose their secret attack on Pearl Harbor to the Americans.

Some historical negationists and conspiracy theorists charge that President Franklin D. Roosevelt willingly allowed the attack to happen to create a pretext for war, but no credible evidence exists to support the claim. The day after the attack on Pearl Harbor, Japan declared war on the U.S. and in response, the U.S. declared war on Japan the same day.

Simultaneously with the bombing of Pearl Harbor on 7 December 1941 (Honolulu time), Japan invaded the British colony of Malaya and bombed Singapore, and began land actions in Hong Kong, without a declaration of war or an ultimatum. Both the United States and United Kingdom were neutral when Japan attacked their territories without explicit warning of a state of war.

The U.S. officially classified all 3,649 military and civilian casualties and destruction of military property at Pearl Harbor as non-combatants as there was no state of war between the U.S. and Japan when the attack occurred. Joseph B. Keenan, the chief prosecutor in the Tokyo Trials, says that the attack on Pearl Harbor not only happened without a declaration of war but was also a "treacherous and deceitful act". In fact, Japan and the U.S. were still negotiating for a possible peace agreement which kept U.S. officials distracted up to the point that Japanese planes launched their attack on Pearl Harbor. Keenan explained the definition of a war of aggression and the criminality of the attack on Pearl Harbor:

Admiral Isoroku Yamamoto, who planned the attack on Pearl Harbor, was fully aware that if Japan lost the war, he would be tried as a war criminal for that attack;  as it turned out, he was killed by the USAAF in Operation Vengeance in 1943. At the Tokyo Trials, Prime Minister Hideki Tojo, Shigenori Tōgō, then Foreign Minister, Shigetarō Shimada, the Minister of the Navy, and Osami Nagano, Chief of Naval General Staff, were charged with crimes against peace (charges 1 to 36) and murder (charges 37 to 52) in connection with the attack on Pearl Harbor. Along with war crimes and crimes against humanity (charges 53 to 55), Tojo was among the seven Japanese leaders sentenced to death and executed by hanging in 1948, Shigenori Tōgō received a 20-year sentence, Shimada received a life sentence, and Nagano died of natural causes during the Trial in 1947.

Over the years, many Japanese nationalists argued that the attack on Pearl Harbor was justified as an act of self-defense in response to the oil embargo imposed by the United States. Most historians and scholars agree that the oil embargo cannot be used as justification for using military force against a foreign nation imposing the embargo because there is a clear distinction between a perception of something being essential to the welfare of the nation-state and a threat sufficiently serious to warrant an act of force in response, which Japan had failed to consider. Japanese scholar and diplomat Takeo Iguchi states that it is "[h]ard to say from the perspective of international law that exercising the right of self-defense against economic pressures is considered valid." While Japan felt that its dreams of further expansion would be brought to a halt by the American embargo, this "need" cannot be considered proportional with the destruction suffered by the U.S. Pacific Fleet at Pearl Harbor, intended by Japanese military planners to be as devastating as possible.

Mass killings

The estimated number of people killed by Japanese troops vary. R. J. Rummel, a professor of political science at the University of Hawaii, estimates that between 1937 and 1945, the Japanese military murdered from nearly three to over ten million people, most likely six million Chinese, Indians, Koreans, Malaysians, Indonesians, Filipinos and Indochinese, among others, including European, American and Australian prisoners of war. According to Rummel, "This democide [i.e., death by government] was due to a morally bankrupt political and military strategy, military expediency and custom, and national culture." According to Rummel, in China alone, from 1937 to 1945, approximately 3.9 million Chinese were killed, mostly civilians, as a direct result of the Japanese operations and a total of 10.2 million Chinese were killed in the course of the war. According to the British historian M. R. D. Foot, civilian deaths were between 10 million and 20 million. Some historians claim that up to 30 million people were killed, most of them civilians.

According to British historian Mark Felton: The Japanese murdered 30 million civilians while "liberating" what it called the Greater East Asia Co-Prosperity Sphere from colonial rule. About 23 million of these were ethnic Chinese. It is a crime that in sheer numbers is far greater than the Nazi Holocaust. In Germany, Holocaust denial is a crime. In Japan, it is government policy. But the evidence against the navy – precious little of which you will find in Japan itself – is damning.

The most infamous incident during this period was the Nanking Massacre of 1937–38, when, according to the findings of the International Military Tribunal for the Far East, the Japanese Army massacred as many as 260,000 civilians and prisoners of war, though some have placed the figure as high as 350,000. The Memorial Hall of the Victims in Nanjing Massacre by Japanese Invaders has the death figure of 300,000 inscribed on its entrance.

During the Second Sino-Japanese War, the Japanese followed what has been called a "killing policy", including killings committed against minorities such as Hui Muslims in China. According to Wan Lei, "In a Hui clustered village in Gaocheng county of Hebei, the Japanese captured twenty Hui men among whom they only set two younger men free through "redemption", and buried alive the other eighteen Hui men. In Mengcun village of Hebei, the Japanese killed more than 1,300 Hui people within three years of their occupation of that area." Mosques were also desecrated and destroyed by the Japanese, and Hui cemeteries were also destroyed. After the Rape of Nanking, mosques in Nanjing were found filled with dead bodies. Many Hui Muslims in the Second Sino-Japanese War fought against the Japanese military.

In addition, The Hui Muslim county of Dachang was subjected to massacres by the Japanese military.

One of the most infamous incidents during this period was the Parit Sulong massacre in Japanese-occupied Malaya, when, according to the findings of the International Military Tribunal for the Far East, the Imperial Japanese Army massacred approximately five hundred prisoners of war, although higher estimates exist. A similar crime committed was the Changjiao massacre in China. Back in Southeast Asia, the Laha massacre resulted in the deaths of  prisoners of war on Japanese-occupied Indonesia's Ambon Island, and in Japanese-occupied Singapore's Alexandra Hospital massacre, hundreds of wounded Allied soldiers, innocent citizens and medical staff were murdered by Japanese soldiers. 

In Southeast Asia, the Manila massacre of February 1945 resulted in the death of 100,000 civilians in the Japanese-occupied Philippines. It is estimated that at least one out of every 20 Filipinos died at the hands of the Japanese during the occupation. In Singapore during February and March 1942, the Sook Ching massacre was a systematic extermination of "anti-Japanese" elements among the Chinese population; however, Japanese soldiers did not try to identify who was "anti-Japanese." As a result, the Japanese soldiers engaged in indiscriminate killing. Former Prime Minister of Singapore Lee Kuan Yew, who was almost a victim of the Sook Ching Massacre, has stated that there were between 50,000 and 90,000 casualties, while according to Major General Kawamura Saburo, there were 5,000 casualties in total. According to Lieutenant Colonel Hishakari Takafumi, a newspaper correspondent at the time, the plan was to ultimately kill about 50,000 Chinese, and 25,000 had already been murdered when the order was received to scale down the operation.

There were other massacres of civilians, e.g. the Kalagon massacre. In wartime Southeast Asia, the Overseas Chinese and European diaspora were special targets of Japanese abuse; in the former case, motivated by Sinophobia vis-à-vis the historic expanse and influence of Chinese culture that did not exist with the Southeast Asian indigenes, and the latter, motivated by a racist Pan-Asianism and a desire to show former colonial subjects the impotence of their Western masters. The Japanese executed all the Malay Sultans on Kalimantan and wiped out the Malay elite in the Pontianak incidents. In the Jesselton Revolt, the Japanese slaughtered thousands of native civilians during the Japanese occupation of British Borneo and nearly wiped out the entire Suluk Muslim population of the coastal islands. During the Japanese occupation of the Philippines, when a Moro Muslim juramentado swordsman launched a suicide attack against the Japanese, the Japanese would massacre the man's entire family or village.

Historian Mitsuyoshi Himeta reports that a "Three Alls Policy" (Sankō Sakusen) was implemented in China from 1942 to 1945 and was in itself responsible for the deaths of "more than 2.7 million" Chinese civilians. This scorched earth strategy, sanctioned by Hirohito himself, directed Japanese forces to "Kill All, Burn All, and Loot All", which caused many massacres such as the Panjiayu massacre, where 1,230 Chinese people were killed, Additionally, captured Allied servicemen and civilians were massacred in various incidents, including the following:
 Alexandra Hospital massacre
 Laha massacre
 Bangka Island massacre
 Parit Sulong Massacre
 Palawan massacre
 SS Behar
 SS Tjisalak massacre perpetrated by Japanese submarine I-8
 Wake Island massacre
 Tinta Massacre
 Bataan Death March
 Sandakan Death Marches
 Shin'yō Maru Incident
 Sulug Island massacre
 Pontianak incidents
 Manila massacre (concurrent with the Battle of Manila)
 Balikpapan massacre
 Rawagede massacre
 Dutch East Indies massacres

Human experimentation and biological warfare

Special Japanese military units conducted experiments on civilians and POWs in China. One of the most infamous was Unit 731 under Shirō Ishii. Unit 731 was established by order of Hirohito himself. Victims were subjected to experiments including but not limited to vivisection, amputations without anesthesia, testing of biological weapons, horse blood transfusions, and injection of animal blood into their corpses. Anesthesia was not used because it was believed that anesthetics would adversely affect the results of the experiments.

According to one estimate, the experiments carried out by Unit 731 alone caused 3,000 deaths. Furthermore, according to the 2002 International Symposium on the Crimes of Bacteriological Warfare, the number of people killed by the Imperial Japanese Army germ warfare and human experiments is around 580,000. Top officers of Unit 731 were not prosecuted for war crimes after the war, in exchange for turning over the results of their research to the Allies. They were also reportedly given responsible positions in Japan's pharmaceutical industry, medical schools and health ministry.

One case of human experimentation occurred in Japan itself. At least
nine of 11 members of Lt.Marvin Watkins' 29th Bomb Group crew (of the 6th Bomb Squadron) survived the crash of their U.S. Army Air Forces B-29 bomber on Kyūshū, on 5 May 1945. The bomber's commander was separated from his crew and sent to Tokyo for interrogation, while the other survivors were taken to the anatomy department of Kyushu University, at Fukuoka, where they were subjected to vivisection or killed.

In China, the Japanese waged ruthless biological warfare against Chinese civilians and soldiers. Japanese aviators sprayed fleas carrying plague germs over metropolitan areas, creating bubonic plague epidemics. Japanese soldiers used flasks of diseases-causing microbes, which included cholera, dysentery, typhoid, anthrax and paratyphoid, to contaminate rivers, wells, reservoirs and houses; mixed food with deadly bacteria to infect hungry Chinese civilians; and even passed out chocolate filled with anthrax bacteria to the local children.

During the final months of World War II, Japan had planned to use plague as a biological weapon against U.S. civilians in San Diego, California, during Operation Cherry Blossoms at Night, hoping that the plague would spread terror to the American population, and thereby dissuade America from attacking Japan. The plan was set to launch at night on 22 September 1945, but Japan surrendered five weeks earlier.

On 11 March 1948, 30 people, including several doctors and one female nurse, were brought to trial by the Allied war crimes tribunal. Charges of cannibalism were dropped, but 23 people were found guilty of vivisection or wrongful removal of body parts. Five were sentenced to death, four to life imprisonment, and the rest to shorter terms. In 1950, the military governor of Japan, General Douglas MacArthur, commuted all of the death sentences and significantly reduced most of the prison terms. All of those convicted in relation to the university vivisection were free after 1958.

In 2006, former IJN medical officer Akira Makino stated that he was ordered—as part of his training—to carry out vivisection on about 30 civilian prisoners in the Philippines between December 1944 and February 1945. The surgery included amputations. Most of Makino's victims were Moro Muslims. Ken Yuasa, a former military doctor in China, has also admitted to similar incidents in which he was aggressively performing live vivisections on live Chinese victims, blaming the nationalistic indoctrination of his schooling for his conduct and lack of remorse.

The Imperial House of Japan was responsible for the human experimentation programs, as members of the imperial family, including Prince Higashikuni Naruhiko, Prince Chichibu, Prince Mikasa and Prince Takeda Tsuneyoshi, participated in the programs in various ways, which included authorizing, funding, supplying, and inspecting biomedical facilities.

Use of chemical weapons

According to historians Yoshiaki Yoshimi and Kentaro Awaya, during the Second Sino-Japanese War, gas weapons, such as tear gas, were used only sporadically in 1937, but in early 1938 the Imperial Japanese Army began full-scale use of phosgene, chlorine, Lewisite and nausea gas (red), and from mid-1939, mustard gas (yellow) was used against both Kuomintang and Communist Chinese troops.

According to Yoshimi and Seiya Matsuno, Emperor Hirohito signed orders specifying the use of chemical weapons in China. For example, during the Battle of Wuhan from August to October 1938, the Emperor authorized the use of toxic gas on 375 separate occasions, despite the 1899 Hague Declaration IV, 2 – Declaration on the Use of Projectiles the Object of Which is the Diffusion of Asphyxiating or Deleterious Gases and Article 23 (a) of the 1907 Hague Convention IV – The Laws and Customs of War on Land. A resolution adopted by the League of Nations on 14 May condemned the use of poison gas by Japan.

According to Prince Mikasa, a member of the imperial family of Japan, he watched an army film that showed Japanese troops gassing Chinese prisoners who were tied to stakes.

Another example is the Battle of Yichang in October 1941, during which the 19th Artillery Regiment helped the 13th Brigade of the IJA 11th Army by launching 1,000 yellow gas shells and 1,500 red gas shells at the Chinese National Revolutionary Army. The area was crowded with Chinese civilians unable to evacuate. Some 3,000 Chinese soldiers were in the area and 1,600 were affected. The Japanese report stated that "the effect of gas seems considerable".

In 2004, Yoshimi and Yuki Tanaka discovered in the Australian National Archives documents showing that cyanide gas was tested on Australian and Dutch prisoners in November 1944 on Kai Islands (Indonesia).

In 2004, Yoshimi Yoshiaki published the most comprehensive study of Japan's military use of poisonous gas in China and also in Southeast Asia. Yoshimi discovered a battle report from a Japanese Infantry Brigade that detailed the use of mustard gas in a major operation against the Communist-led Eighth Route Army in Shanxi Province in the winter of 1942. The unit carrying out the operation noted its severity, and commented on the anti-Japanese sentiment among the civilian population affected.

Torture of prisoners of war

Japanese imperial forces employed widespread use of torture on prisoners, usually in an effort to gather military intelligence quickly. Tortured prisoners were often later executed. A former Japanese Army officer who served in China, Uno Shintaro, stated:

The effectiveness of torture might also have been counterproductive to Japan's war effort. After the atomic bombing of Hiroshima during World War II, the Japanese secret police tortured a captured American P-51 fighter pilot named Marcus McDilda to discover how many atomic bombs the Allies had and what the future targets were. McDilda, who had originally told his captors he knew nothing about the atomic bomb (and who indeed knew nothing about nuclear fission), "confessed" under further torture that the US had 100 atomic bombs and that Tokyo and Kyoto were the next targets:

According to many historians, one of the favorite techniques of Japanese torturers was "simulated drowning", in which water was poured over the immobilized victim's head, until they suffocated and lost consciousness. They were then resuscitated brutally (usually with the torturer jumping on their abdomen to expel the water) and then subjected to a new session of torture. The entire process could be repeated for about twenty minutes.

Execution and killing of captured Allied airmen

Many Allied airmen captured by the Japanese on land or at sea were executed in accordance with official Japanese policy. During the Battle of Midway in June 1942, three American airmen who were shot down and landed at sea were spotted and captured by Imperial Japanese Navy warships. After being tortured, machinist mate first class Bruno Gaido and his pilot Ensign Frank O'Flaherty, were tied to five-gallon kerosene cans filled with water and dumped overboard from the Japanese destroyer Makigumo; a third airman, Ensign Wesley Osmus, was fatally wounded with an axe before pushed into the sea from the stern of the Arashi.

On 13 August 1942, Japan passed the Enemy Airmen's Act, which stated that Allied pilots who bombed non-military targets in the Pacific Theater and were captured by Japanese forces were subject to trial and punishment, despite the absence of any international law containing provisions regarding aerial warfare. This legislation was passed in response to the Doolittle Raid on 18 April 1942, in which American B-25 bombers under the command of Lieutenant Colonel James Doolittle bombed Tokyo and other Japanese cities. According to the Hague Convention of 1907 (the only convention Japan had ratified regarding the treatment of prisoners of war), any military personnel captured on land or at sea by enemy troops were to be treated as prisoners of war and not punished for simply being lawful combatants. Eight Doolittle Raiders captured upon landing in China (four months before the passage of the Act) were the first Allied aircrew to be brought before a kangaroo court in Shanghai under the act, charged with alleged (but unproven) strafing of Japanese civilians during the Doolittle Raid. The eight aircrew were forbidden to present any defense and, despite the lack of legitimate evidence, were found guilty of participating in aerial military operations against Japan. Five of the eight sentences were commuted to life imprisonment; the other three airmen were taken to a cemetery outside Shanghai, where they were executed by firing squad on 14 October 1942.

The Enemy Airmen's Act contributed to the deaths of hundreds of Allied airmen throughout the Pacific War. An estimated 132 Allied airmen shot down during the bombing campaign against Japan in 1944–1945 were summarily executed after short kangaroo trials or drumhead courts-martial. Imperial Japanese military personnel deliberately killed 33 American airmen at Fukuoka, including fifteen who were beheaded shortly after the Japanese Government's intention to surrender was announced on 15 August 1945. Mobs of civilians also killed several Allied airmen before the Japanese military arrived to take the airmen into custody. Another 94 airmen died from other causes while in Japanese custody, including 52 who were killed when they were deliberately abandoned in a prison during the bombing of Tokyo on 24–25 May 1945.

Execution and killing of captured Allied seamen
Rear Admiral Takero Kouta, commander of the Japanese First Submarine Force at Truk, on 20 March 1943 sent out to subs under his command an order to kill Merchant Navy crewman after the ship was sunk.
All of the crew and passengers made it into the lifeboats safety. The I-8 forced the 100 onto the deck of the submarine and then killed most of them. The I-8 crew shot at both the crew and the lifeboats. The submarine crew took the crew's valuables. Those not shot, about 30 crew members, were hit and stabbed on the deck. Seeing a plane, the submarine crew tossed overboard the remaining crew and dived. A Catalina flying boat spotted the crew in the water and sent  Royal Navy armed trawler  rescued the men. After over 30 hours in the water the crew was rescued on 4 July 1944.
Merchant Navy SS Behar sank on 6 March 1944, in the Indian Ocean, seventy-two merchant seamen made it into lifeboats. They were taken aboard the heavy cruisers Tone and the crew's valuables taken. The crew was roped up in painful positions, beaten, and locked in an extremely hot store room. By order of Vice Admiral Sakonju, the crew, men and women, were killed. Sakonju was executed for his war crimes in 1947.
Japanese submarine I-26 after sinking the merchant ship SS Richard Hovey in the Arabian Sea, shot at the crew in their three lifeboats and a two life rafts. I-26 rammed one lifeboats capsizing it. I-26 took the captain and three crew POWs. The four survived and were repatriated after the end of the war.
 Planes from the Japanese aircraft carrier Hiryū sank and killed crew and passengers in the SS Poelau Bras's lifeboats, sinking six of the nine boats off Sumatra.
I-37 on 27 November 1943 shot and killed eight crewmen in the MV Scotia lifeboats. On 22 February 1944 shot at 's lifeboats, 13 were killed. On 29 February 1944  SS Ascots lifeboats shot at, only seven survivors.
I-165 on 18 March 1944 shot at 's lifeboats, 23 killed.
I-12 on 28 October 1944 shot at the lifeboats of the SS John A. Johnson, killing eleven.
 One survivor, James Blears, a 21-year-old radio operator, of the crew of the  lived to tell of the torturing and execution of the lifeboat crew by submarine I-8. How many other lifeboat crews did not have survivors is not known.
Cargo ship Langkoeas lifeboats attacked by I-158
Tanker Augustina massacre, in the Western Java Sea, 1942, lifeboats machine-gunned, only 2 survived.

Cannibalism

Many written reports and testimonies which were collected by the Australian War Crimes Section of the Tokyo tribunal, and investigated by prosecutor William Webb (the tribunal's future Judge-in-Chief), indicate that Japanese personnel committed acts of cannibalism against Allied prisoners of war in many parts of Asia and the Pacific. In many cases, these acts of cannibalism were inspired by ever-increasing Allied attacks on Japanese supply lines, and the death and illness of Japanese personnel which resulted from hunger. According to historian Yuki Tanaka: "cannibalism was often a systematic activity which was conducted by whole squads which were under the command of officers". This frequently involved murder for the purpose of securing bodies. For example, an Indian POW, Havildar Changdi Ram, testified that: "[on November 12, 1944] the Kempeitai beheaded [an Allied] pilot. I saw this from behind a tree and watched some of the Japanese cut flesh from his arms, legs, hips, buttocks and carry it off to their quarters ... They cut it [into] small pieces and fried it."

In some cases, flesh was cut from living people: another Indian POW, Lance Naik Hatam Ali (later a citizen of Pakistan), testified in New Guinea and stated:

According to another account by Jemadar Abdul Latif of 4/9 Jat Regiment of the Indian Army who was rescued by the Australian Army at the Sepik Bay in 1945:

Perhaps the most senior officer convicted of cannibalism was Lt Gen. Yoshio Tachibana (立花芳夫,Tachibana Yoshio), who with 11 other Japanese personnel was tried in August 1946 in relation to the execution of U.S. Navy airmen, and the cannibalism of at least one of them, during August 1944, on Chichi Jima, in the Bonin Islands. The airmen were beheaded on Tachibana's orders. Because military and international law did not specifically deal with cannibalism, they were tried for murder and "prevention of honorable burial". Tachibana was sentenced to death, and hanged.

 Avoidable hunger 

Deaths caused by the diversion of resources to Japanese troops in occupied countries are also considered war crimes by many people.Researching Japanese War Crimes January 28, 2015,  National Archives Millions of civilians in Southeast Asia – especially in Vietnam and Dutch East Indies, which were major producers of rice – died during the avoidable hunger in 1944–45.

In the Vietnamese Famine of 1945 one to two million Vietnamese starved to death in the Red River delta of northern Vietnam due to the Japanese, as the Japanese seized Vietnamese rice without paying for it. In Phat Diem the Vietnamese farmer Di Ho was one of the few survivors who saw the Japanese steal grain. The North Vietnamese government accused both France and Japan of the famine and said 1–2 million Vietnamese died. Võ An Ninh took photographs of dead and dying Vietnamese during the great famine. Starving Vietnamese were dying throughout northern Vietnam in 1945 due to the Japanese seizure of their crops. By the time the Chinese came to disarm the Japanese forces, Vietnamese corpses were on the streets of Hanoi and had to be cleaned up by students.

Forced labor

The Japanese military's use of forced labor, by Asian civilians and POWs, also caused many deaths. According to a joint study by historians including Zhifen Ju, Mitsuyoshi Himeta, Toru Kubo and Mark Peattie, more than 10 million Chinese civilians were mobilised by the Kōa-in (Japanese Asia Development Board) to perform forced labour. More than 100,000 civilians and POWs died in the construction of the Burma-Siam Railway.

The U.S. Library of Congress estimates that in Java the Japanese military forced between four and ten million romusha (Japanese: "manual laborers") to work. About 270 000 of these Javanese laborers were sent to other Japanese-held areas in Southeast Asia, but only 52 000 were repatriated to Java, likely indicating an eighty percent death rate.

According to historian Akira Fujiwara, Emperor Hirohito personally ratified the decision to remove the constraints of international law (The Hague Conventions) on the treatment of Chinese prisoners of war in the directive of 5 August 1937. This notification also advised staff officers to stop using the term "prisoners of war". The Geneva Convention exempted POWs of sergeant rank or higher from manual labour, and stipulated that prisoners performing work should be provided with extra rations and other essentials. Japan was not a signatory to the 1929 Geneva Convention on the Prisoners of War at the time, and Japanese forces did not follow the convention, although they ratified the 1929 Geneva Convention on the Sick And Wounded.US Navy, U.S. Prisoners of War and Civilian American Citizens Captured and Interned by Japan in World War II, December 17, 2002

Shortly after the war, Japan's Foreign Ministry wrote a comprehensive report about Chinese laborers. The report estimated that of some 40,000 Chinese laborers taken to Japan, nearly 7,000 had died by the end of the war. The Japanaese burned all copies except for one for the fear of that it might become incriminating evidence at the war crimes trials. In 1958, a Chinese man was discovered hiding in the mountains of Hokkaido. The man did not know that the war was over, and he was one of thousands of laborers who were taken to Japan. This specific event brought attention to Japan's use of forced Asian labor during the war. 

Korean men and women were the largest group forced into labor in wartime Japan, and many were not able to return to Korea afterwards.

Rape

The expressions ianfu (慰安婦) or jūgun ianfu (従軍慰安婦) are euphemisms for women used in military brothels in occupied countries, many of whom were forcefully recruited or recruited through fraud, and who are considered victims of sexual assault and/or sexual slavery.

In 1992, historian Yoshiaki Yoshimi published material based on his research in archives at Japan's National Institute for Defense Studies. Yoshimi claimed that there was a direct link between imperial institutions such as the Kōain and "comfort stations". When Yoshimi's findings were published in the Japanese news media on 12 January 1993, they caused a sensation and forced the government, represented by Chief Cabinet Secretary Kato Koichi, to acknowledge some of the facts that same day. On 17 January, Prime Minister Kiichi Miyazawa presented formal apologies for the suffering of the victims, during a trip in South Korea. On 6 July and 4 August, the Japanese government issued two statements by which it recognised that "Comfort stations were operated in response to the request of the military of the day", "The Japanese military was, directly or indirectly, involved in the establishment and management of the comfort stations and the transfer of comfort women", and that the women were "recruited in many cases against their own will through coaxing and coercion".

The controversy was re-ignited on 1 March 2007, when Japanese Prime Minister Shinzō Abe mentioned suggestions that a U.S. House of Representatives committee would call on the Japanese Government to "apologize for and acknowledge" the role of the Japanese Imperial military in wartime sex slavery. Abe denied that the Japanese Imperial military engaged in sex slavery. Abe's comments provoked negative reactions overseas.

The same day, veteran soldier Yasuji Kaneko admitted to The Washington Post that the women "cried out, but it didn't matter to us whether the women lived or died. We were the emperor's soldiers. Whether in military brothels or in the villages, we raped without reluctance."

There is disagreement on the comfort women's countries of origin. While some Japanese sources claim that the majority of the women were from Japan, others, including Yoshimi, argue as many as 200,000 women, mostly from Korea, and some other countries such as China, Philippines, Burma, the Dutch East Indies, Netherlands, and Australia were forced to engage in sexual activity.

The Bahay na Pula in the Philippines was an example of a military-operated garrison where local women were raped.

On 17 April 2007, Yoshimi and another historian, Hirofumi Hayashi, announced the discovery, in the archives of the Tokyo Trials, of seven official documents suggesting that Imperial military forces, such as the Tokkeitai (naval secret police), directly coerced women to work in frontline brothels in China, Indochina and Indonesia. These documents were initially made public at the war crimes trial. In one of these, a lieutenant is quoted as confessing having organized a brothel and having used it himself. Another source refers to Tokkeitai members having arrested women on the streets, and after enforced medical examinations, putting them in brothels.

On 12 May 2007, journalist Taichiro Kaijimura announced the discovery of 30 Netherland government documents submitted to the Tokyo tribunal as evidence of a forced massed prostitution incident in 1944 in Magelang.

In other cases, some victims from East Timor testified they were dragged from their homes and forced into prostitution at military brothels even when they were not old enough to have started menstruating and were repeatedly raped by Japanese soldiers "Night after Night".

A Dutch-Indonesian comfort woman, Jan Ruff O'Herne (now resident in Australia), who gave evidence to the U.S. committee, said the Japanese Government had failed to take responsibility for its crimes, that it did not want to pay compensation to victims and that it wanted to rewrite history. Ruff O'Herne said that she had been raped "day and night" for three months by Japanese soldiers when she was 21.

The Japanese also forced Vietnamese women to become comfort women; they made up a notable portion, along with Burmese, Indonesia, Thai and Filipino women, of comfort women. Japanese use of Malaysian and Vietnamese women as comfort women was corroborated by testimonies. There were comfort women stations in Malaysia, Indonesia, Philippines, Burma, Thailand, Cambodia, Vietnam, North Korea and South Korea.

On 26 June 2007, the United States House Committee on Foreign Affairs passed a resolution asking that Japan "should acknowledge, apologize and accept historical responsibility in a clear and unequivocal manner for its military's coercion of women into sexual slavery during the war". On 30 July 2007, the House of Representatives passed the resolution. Japanese Prime Minister Shinzō Abe said this decision was "regrettable".

In addition to the systematic use of comfort women, Japanese troops engaged in wholesale rape in China. John Rabe, the leader of a Safety Zone in Nanjing, China, kept a diary during the Nanjing Massacre, and wrote about the Japanese atrocities committed against the people in the Safety Zone. In an entry dated 17 December 1937, he wrote:Two Japanese soldiers have climbed over the garden wall and are about to break into our house. When I appear they give the excuse that they saw two Chinese soldiers climb over the wall. When I show them my party badge, they return the same way. In one of the houses in the narrow street behind my garden wall, a woman was raped, and then wounded in the neck with a bayonet. I managed to get an ambulance so we can take her to Kulou Hospital ... Last night up to 1,000 women and girls are said to have been raped, about 100 girls at Ginling College...alone. You hear nothing but rape. If husbands or brothers intervene, they're shot. What you hear and see on all sides is the brutality and bestiality of the Japanese soldiers.

Looting

Several scholars have claimed that the Japanese government, along with Japanese military personnel, engaged in widespread looting during the period of 1895 to 1945.Sterling & Peggy Seagrave, 2003, Gold warriors: America's secret recovery of Yamashita's gold, London: Verso Books The stolen property included private land, as well as many different kinds of valuable goods looted from banks, depositories, vaults, temples, churches, mosques, art galleries, commercial offices, libraries (including Buddhist monasteries), museums and other commercial premises, as well as private homes.

In China, an eyewitness, journalist F. Tillman of The New York Times, sent an article to his newspaper where he described the Imperial Japanese Army's entry into Nanjing in December 1937: "The plunder carried out by the Japanese reached almost the entire city. Almost all buildings were entered by Japanese soldiers, often in the sight of their officers, and the men took whatever they wanted. Japanese soldiers often forced Chinese to carry the loot."

In Korea, it is estimated that about  priceless artifacts and cultural goods were looted by Japanese colonial authorities and private collectors during the nearly fifty years of military occupation. The Administration claims that there are 41,109 cultural objects which are located in Japan but remain unreported by the Japanese authorities. Unlike the works of art looted by Nazis in Europe, the return of property to its rightful owners, or even the discussion of financial reparations in the post-war period, met with strong resistance from the American government, particularly General Douglas MacArthur.

According to several historians, MacArthur's disagreement was not based on issues of rights, ethics or morals, but on political convenience. He spoke on the topic in a radio message to the U.S. Army in May 1948, the transcript of which was found by the magazine Time in the U.S. National Archives. In it, MacArthur states: "I am completely at odds with the minority view of replacing lost or destroyed cultural property as a result of military action and occupation". With the advent of the Cold War, the general feared "embittering the Japanese people towards us and making Japan vulnerable to ideological pressures and a fertile ground for subversive action".

Kyoichi Arimitsu, one of the last living survivors of the Japanese archeological missions which operated on the Korean peninsula, which started early in the twentieth century, agrees that the plunder in the 1930s was out of control, but that researchers and academics, such as himself, had nothing to do with it. However, he recognizes that the excavated pieces which were deemed to be most historically significant were sent to the Japanese governor-general, who then decided what would be sent to Emperor Hirohito.

In 1965, when Japan and South Korea negotiated a treaty to reestablish diplomatic relations the issue of returning the cultural artifacts was raised. However, the then South Korean dictator, Park Chung-hee, preferred to receive cash compensation that would allow him to build highways and steelworks; works of art and cultural goods were not a priority. As a result, at the time the Koreans had to settle for the return of only 1,326 items, including 852 rare books and 438 ceramic pieces. The Japanese claim that this put an end to any Korean claim regarding reparation for cultural goods (or of any other nature). American journalist Brad Glosserman has stated that an increasing number of South Koreans are raising the issue of the repatriation of stolen cultural artifacts from Japan due to rising affluence among the general populace as well as increased national confidence.

Perfidy

Throughout the Pacific War, Japanese soldiers often feigned injury or surrender to lure approaching American forces before attacking them. One of the most infamous examples of this was the "Goettge Patrol" during the early days of the Guadalcanal Campaign in August 1942. After the patrol saw a white flag displayed on the west bank of Matanikau River, Marine Corps Lieutenant Colonel Frank Goettge assembled 25 men, primarily consisting of intelligence personnel, to search the area. Unbeknownst to the patrol, the white flag was actually a Japanese flag with the Hinomaru disc insignia obscured. A Japanese prisoner earlier deliberately tricked the Marines into an ambush by telling them that there were a number of Japanese soldiers west of the Matanikau River who wanted to surrender. The Goettge Patrol landed by boat west of the Lunga Point perimeter, between Point Cruz and the Matanikau River, on a reconnaissance mission to contact a group of Japanese troops that American forces believed might be willing to surrender. Soon after the patrol landed, a group of Japanese naval troops ambushed and almost completely wiped out the patrol. Goettge was among the dead. Only three Americans made it back to American lines in the Lunga Point perimeter alive.

News of the killing and treachery by the Japanese outraged the American Marines:

Second Lieutenant D. A. Clark of the 7th Marines told a similar story while patrolling Guadalcanal:

Samuel Eliot Morison, in his book, The Two-Ocean War: A Short History of the United States Navy in the Second World War, wrote:

 (A PT is a patrol torpedo boat and a bluejacket is an enlisted sailor.)

These incidents, along with many other perfidious actions of the Japanese throughout the Pacific War, led to an American tendency to shoot dead or wounded Japanese soldiers and those attempting to surrender and not readily take them as prisoners of war. Two Marines of Iwo Jima told cautionary tales. One confided:

Attacks on hospital ships

Hospital ships are painted white with large red crosses to show they are not combat ships but vessels carrying wounded people and medical staff. Japan had signed the Hague Convention X of 1907 that stated attacking a hospital ship is a war crime.
The plane crashed through three decks, exploding in surgery, which was filled with medical personnel and patients. Casualties were 28 killed (including six nurses) and 48 wounded, with considerable damage done to the ship.
 The  was attacked and damaged during the Battle of Leyte Gulf and the Battle of Okinawa.
 The USS Relief was attacked and damaged at Guam on 2 April 1945.
 On 19 February 1942, the Australian HMHS Manunda was dive-bombed during the Japanese air raids on Darwin; twelve crew and hospital staff were killed and nineteen others were seriously wounded.
 On 14 May 1943, the Australian AHS Centaur was sunk by Japanese submarine I-177 off Stradbroke Island, Queensland with 268 lives lost.
 The Royal Netherlands Navy hospital ship SS Op ten Noort was bombed on 21 February 1942, in the Java Sea. One surgeon and three nurses were killed, and eleven were badly wounded. After repairs, on 28 February 1942, she was commandeered by the Japanese destroyer Amatsukaze near Bawean Island. The Japanese forced her to transport their POWs. On 20 December 1942, she became the Tenno Maru, a Japanese hospital ship, and the Dutch crew became POWs. As the war came to an end, the ship was first modified and later sunk to cover up the crime.

War crimes in Vietnam

The Viet Minh had begun fighting the Vichy French in 1944, then began attacking the Japanese in early 1945 after Japan replaced the French government on 9 March 1945.[Article by Truong Chinh, chairman of the National Assembly: "Revolution or Coup d'Etat"; Hanoi, Nhan Dan, Vietnamese, 16 August 1970, pp 1, 3] *Reprinted from Co Giai Phong [Liberation Banner], No. 16, 12 September 1945. After the Viet Minh rejected Japanese demands to cease fighting and support Japan, the Japanese implemented the Three Alls policy (San Kuang) against the Vietnamese, pillaging, burning, killing, and raping Vietnamese women.

They shot a Vietnamese pharmacy student to death outside of his own house when he was coming home from guard duty at a hospital after midnight in Hanoi and also shot a defendant for a political case in the same city. In Thái Nguyên province, Vo Nhai, a Vietnamese boat builder, was thrown in a river and had his stomach stabbed by the Japanese under suspicion of helping Viet Minh guerillas. The Japanese slit the abdomen and hung the Đại Từ mayor upside down in Thái Nguyên as well. 
The Japanese committed some of these atrocities in Thái Nguyên province at Định Hóa, Võ Nhai and Hùng Sơn. The Japanese also beat thousands of people in Hanoi for not cooperating.

Japanese officers ordered their soldiers to behead and burn Vietnamese. Some claimed that Taiwanese and Manchurian soldiers in the Japanese army were participating in atrocities against the Vietnamese.

The Japanese on occasion attacked Vietnamese while masquerading as Viet Minh. They also tried to play the Vietnamese against the French by spreading false rumours that the French were massacring Vietnamese at the time to distract the Vietnamese from Japanese atrocities. Similarly, they attempted to play the Laotians against the Vietnamese by inciting Lao people to kill Vietnamese, as Lao murdered seven Vietnamese officials in Luang Prabang and Lao youths were recruited to an anti-Vietnam organization by the Japanese when they took over Luang Prabang.

The Japanese also started openly looting the Vietnamese. In addition to taking French-owned properties Japanese soldiers stole watches, pencils, bicycles, money and clothing.

Vietnam was in the grip of a famine in 1945 caused in part by Japanese requisition of food without payment; the Japanese beheaded Vietnamese who stole bread and corn while they were starving.Article by Truong Chinh, chairman of the National Assembly: "Policy of the Japanese Pirates Towards Our people"; Hanoi, Nhan Dan, Vietnamese, 17 August 1970, pp 1, 3] The Vietnamese professor Văn Tạo and Japanese professor Furuta Moto both conducted a study in the field on the Japanese induced famine of 1945 admitting that Japan killed two million Vietnamese by starvation.

On 25 March 2000, the Vietnamese journalist Trần Khuê wrote an article "Dân chủ: Vấn đề của dân tộc và thời đại" in which he harshly criticized ethnographers and historians in Ho Chin Minh City's Institute of Social Sciences such as Dr. Đinh Văn Liên and Professor Mạc Đường for trying to whitewash Japan's atrocities against the Vietnamese by, among other things, changing the death toll of two million Vietnamese dead at the hands of the Japanese famine to one million, calling the Japanese invasion as a presence and calling Japanese fascists as simply Japanese at the Vietnam-Japan international conference.

War crimes trials

Soon after the war, the Allied powers indicted 25 persons as Class-A war criminals, and 5,700 persons were indicted as Class-B or Class-C war criminals by Allied criminal courts. Of these, 984 were initially condemned to death, 920 were actually executed, 475 received life sentences, 2,944 received prison terms, 1,018 were acquitted, and 279 were not sentenced or not brought to trial. These indicted war criminals included 178 ethnic Taiwanese and 148 ethnic Koreans people. Class A criminals were all tried by the International Military Tribunal for the Far East, also known as "the Tokyo Trials". Other courts were held in numerous places across Asia and the Pacific.

Tokyo Trials

The International Military Tribunal for the Far East was formed to try accused people in Japan itself.

High-ranking officers who were tried included Kōichi Kido and Sadao Araki. Three former (unelected) prime ministers: Kōki Hirota, Hideki Tojo and Kuniaki Koiso were convicted of Class-A war crimes. Many military leaders were also convicted. Two people convicted as Class-A war criminals later served as ministers in post-war Japanese governments.
 Mamoru Shigemitsu served as Minister for Foreign Affairs both during the war and in the post-war Hatoyama government.
 Okinori Kaya was Minister of Finance during the war and later served as Minister of Justice in the government of Hayato Ikeda. These two had no direct connection to alleged war crimes committed by Japanese forces, and foreign governments never raised the issue when they were appointed.

Hirohito and all members of the Imperial House of Japan implicated in the war such as Prince Chichibu, Prince Asaka, Prince Takeda and Prince Higashikuni were exonerated from criminal prosecutions by Douglas MacArthur, with the help of Bonner Fellers who allowed the major criminal suspects to coordinate their stories so that the Emperor would be spared from indictment.

Some historians criticize this decision. According to John Dower, "with the full support of MacArthur's headquarters, the prosecution functioned, in effect, as a defense team for the emperor" and even Japanese activists who endorse the ideals of the Nuremberg and Tokyo charters, and who have labored to document and publicize the atrocities of the Showa regime "cannot defend the American decision to exonerate the emperor of war responsibility and then, in the chill of the Cold War, release and soon afterwards openly embrace accused right-winged war criminals like the later prime minister Nobusuke Kishi." For Herbert Bix, "MacArthur's truly extraordinary measures to save Hirohito from trial as a war criminal had a lasting and profoundly distorting impact on Japanese understanding of the lost war."

MacArthur's reasoning was that if the emperor were executed or sentenced to life imprisonment, there would be a violent backlash and revolution from the Japanese from all social classes, which would interfere with his primary goal to change Japan from a militarist, semi-feudal society to a pro-Western modern democracy. In a cable sent to General Dwight D. Eisenhower in February 1946, MacArthur said executing or imprisoning the emperor would require the use of one million occupation soldiers to keep the peace.

Other trials

Between 1946 and 1951, the United States, the United Kingdom, China, the Soviet Union, Australia, New Zealand, Canada, France, the Netherlands and the Philippines all held military tribunals to try Japanese indicted for Class B and Class C war crimes. Some 5,600 Japanese personnel were prosecuted in over 2,200 trials outside Japan. Class B defendants were accused of having committed such crimes themselves; class C defendants, mostly senior officers, were accused of planning, ordering or failing to prevent them.

The judges presiding came from the United States, China, the United Kingdom, Australia, the Netherlands, France, the Soviet Union, New Zealand, India and the Philippines. Additionally, the Chinese Communists also held a number of trials for Japanese personnel. More than 4,400 Japanese personnel were convicted and about 1,000 were sentenced to death.

The largest single trial was that of 93 Japanese personnel charged with the summary execution of more than 300 Allied POWs in the Laha massacre (1942). The most prominent ethnic Korean convicted was Lieutenant General Hong Sa Ik, who orchestrated the organisation of prisoner of war camps in Southeast Asia. In 2006, the South Korean government "pardoned" 83 of the 148 convicted Korean war criminals. One hundred-sixty Taiwanese who had served in the forces of the Empire of Japan were convicted of war crimes; 11 were executed.

Post-war events and reactions

The parole-for-war-criminals movement

In 1950, after most Allied war crimes trials had ended, thousands of convicted war criminals sat in prisons across Asia and across Europe, detained in the countries where they were convicted. Some executions were still outstanding as many Allied courts agreed to reexamine their verdicts, reducing sentences in some cases and instituting a system of parole, but without relinquishing control over the fate of the imprisoned (even after Japan had regained its status as a sovereign country).

An intense and broadly supported campaign for amnesty for all imprisoned war criminals ensued (more aggressively in Germany than in Japan at first), as attention turned away from the top wartime leaders and towards the majority of "ordinary" war criminals (Class B/C in Japan), and the issue of criminal responsibility was reframed as a humanitarian problem.

The British authorities lacked the resources and will to fully commit themselves to pursuing Japanese war criminals.

On 7 March 1950, MacArthur issued a directive that reduced the sentences by one-third for good behavior and authorized the parole of those who had received life sentences after fifteen years. Several of those who were imprisoned were released earlier on parole due to ill-health.

The Japanese popular reaction to the Tokyo War Crimes Tribunal found expression in demands for the mitigation of the sentences of war criminals and agitation for parole. Shortly after the San Francisco Peace Treaty came into effect in April 1952, a movement demanding the release of B- and C-class war criminals began, emphasizing the "unfairness of the war crimes tribunals" and the "misery and hardship of the families of war criminals". The movement quickly garnered the support of more than ten million Japanese. In the face of this surge of public opinion, the government commented that "public sentiment in our country is that the war criminals are not criminals. Rather, they gather great sympathy as victims of the war, and the number of people concerned about the war crimes tribunal system itself is steadily increasing."

The parole-for-war-criminals movement was driven by two groups: those from outside who had "a sense of pity" for the prisoners; and the war criminals themselves who called for their own release as part of an anti-war peace movement. The movement that arose out of "a sense of pity" demanded "just set them free (tonikaku shakuho o) regardless of how it is done".

On 4 September 1952, President Truman issued Executive Order 10393, establishing a Clemency and Parole Board for War Criminals to advise the President with respect to recommendations by the Government of Japan for clemency, reduction of sentence, or parole, with respect to sentences imposed on Japanese war criminals by military tribunals.

On 26 May 1954, Secretary of State John Foster Dulles rejected a proposed amnesty for the imprisoned war criminals but instead agreed to "change the ground rules" by reducing the period required for eligibility for parole from 15 years to 10.

By the end of 1958, all Japanese war criminals, including A-, B- and C-class were released from prison and politically rehabilitated. Kingorō Hashimoto, Shunroku Hata, Jirō Minami and Oka Takazumi were all released on parole in 1954. Sadao Araki, Kiichirō Hiranuma, Naoki Hoshino, Okinori Kaya, Kōichi Kido, Hiroshi Ōshima, Shigetarō Shimada and Teiichi Suzuki were released on parole in 1955. Satō Kenryō, whom many, including Judge B.V.A. Röling regarded as one of the convicted war criminals least deserving of imprisonment, was not granted parole until March 1956, the last of the Class A Japanese war criminals to be released. On 7 April 1957, the Japanese government announced that, with the concurrence of a majority of the powers represented on the tribunal, the last ten major Japanese war criminals who had previously been paroled were granted clemency and were to be regarded henceforth as unconditionally free from the terms of their parole.

Official apologies

The Japanese government considers that the legal and moral positions in regard to war crimes are separate. Therefore, while maintaining that Japan violated no international law or treaties, Japanese governments have officially recognised the suffering which the Japanese military caused, and numerous apologies have been issued by the Japanese government. For example, Prime Minister Tomiichi Murayama, in August 1995, stated that Japan "through its colonial rule and aggression, caused tremendous damage and suffering to the people of many countries, particularly to those of Asian nations", and he expressed his "feelings of deep remorse" and stated his "heartfelt apology". Also, on 29 September 1972, Japanese Prime Minister Kakuei Tanaka stated: "[t]he Japanese side is keenly conscious of the responsibility for the serious damage that Japan caused in the past to the Chinese people through war, and deeply reproaches itself."

The official apologies are widely viewed as inadequate or only a symbolic exchange by many of the survivors of such crimes or the families of dead victims. In October 2006, while Prime Minister Shinzo Abe expressed an apology for the damage caused by its colonial rule and aggression, more than 80 Japanese lawmakers from the ruling Liberal Democratic Party paid visits to the Yasukuni Shrine. Many people aggrieved by Japanese war crimes also maintain that no apology has been issued for particular acts or that the Japanese government has merely expressed "regret" or "remorse". On 2 March 2007, the issue was raised again by Japanese prime minister Shinzō Abe, in which he denied that the military had forced women into sexual slavery during World War II. He stated, "The fact is, there is no evidence to prove there was coercion." Before he spoke, a group of LDP lawmakers also sought to revise the Kono Statement. This provoked negative reaction from Asian and Western countries.

On 31 October 2008, the chief of staff of Japan's Air Self-Defense Force Toshio Tamogami was dismissed with a 60 million yen allowance due to an essay he published, arguing that Japan was not an aggressor during World War II, that the war brought prosperity to China, Taiwan and Korea, that the Imperial Japanese Army's conduct was not violent and that the Greater East Asia War is viewed in a positive way by many Asian countries and criticizing the war crimes trials which followed the war. On 11 November, Tamogami added before the Diet that the personal apology made in 1995 by former prime minister Tomiichi Murayama was "a tool to suppress free speech".

Some in Japan have asserted that what is being demanded is that the Japanese Prime Minister or the Emperor perform dogeza, in which an individual kneels and bows his head to the ground—a high form of apology in East Asian societies that Japan appears unwilling to do. Some point to an act by West German Chancellor Willy Brandt, who knelt at a monument to the Jewish victims of the Warsaw Ghetto, in 1970, as an example of a powerful and effective act of apology and reconciliation similar to dogeza.

On 13 September 2010, Japanese Foreign Minister Katsuya Okada met in Tokyo with six former American POWs of the Japanese and apologized for their treatment during World War II. Okada said: "You have all been through hardships during World War II, being taken prisoner by the Japanese military, and suffered extremely inhumane treatment. On behalf of the Japanese government and as the foreign minister, I would like to offer you my heartfelt apology."

On 29 November 2011, Japanese Foreign Minister Kōichirō Genba apologized to former Australian POWs on behalf of the Japanese government for pain and suffering inflicted on them during the war.

Compensation

The Japanese government, while admitting no legal responsibility for the so-called "comfort women", set up the Asian Women's Fund in 1995, which gives money to people who claim to have been forced into prostitution during the war. Though the organisation was established by the government, legally, it has been created such that it is an independent charity. The activities of the fund have been controversial in Japan, as well as with international organisations supporting the women concerned.

Some argue that such a fund is part of an ongoing refusal by the Japanese government to face up to its responsibilities, while others say that the Japanese government has long since finalised its responsibility to individual victims and is merely correcting the failures of the victims' own governments. California Congressman Mike Honda, speaking before U.S. House of Representatives on behalf of the women, said that "without a sincere and unequivocal apology from the government of Japan, the majority of surviving Comfort Women refused to accept these funds. In fact, as you will hear today, many Comfort Women returned the Prime Minister's letter of apology accompanying the monetary compensation, saying they felt the apology was artificial and disingenuous."

Intermediate compensation

The term "intermediate compensation" (or intermediary compensation) was applied to the removal and reallocation of Japanese industrial (particularly military-industrial) assets to Allied countries. It was conducted under the supervision of Allied occupation forces. This reallocation was referred to as "intermediate" because it did not amount to a final settlement by means of bilateral treaties, which settled all existing issues of compensation. By 1950, the assets reallocated amounted to 43,918 items of machinery, valued at ¥165,158,839 (in 1950 prices). The proportions in which the assets were distributed were: China, 54.1%; the Netherlands, 11.5%; the Philippines 19%, and; the United Kingdom, 15.4%.

Compensation under the San Francisco Treaty

Compensation from Japanese overseas assets

"Japanese overseas assets" refers to all assets which were owned by the Japanese government, firms, organizations and private citizens, in colonized or occupied countries. In accordance with Clause 14 of the San Francisco Treaty, Allied forces confiscated all Japanese overseas assets, except those in China, which were dealt with under Clause 21.

Compensation to Allied POWs

Clause 16 of the San Francisco Treaty stated that Japan would transfer its assets and those of its citizens in countries which were at war with any of the Allied Powers or which were neutral, or equivalents, to the International Committee of the Red Cross, which would sell them and distribute the funds to former prisoners of war and their families. Accordingly, the Japanese government and private citizens paid out £4,500,000 to the Red Cross.

According to historian Linda Goetz Holmes, many funds used by the government of Japan were not Japanese funds but relief funds contributed by the governments of the US, the UK and the Netherlands and sequestered in the Yokohama Specie Bank during the final year of the war.

Allied territories occupied by Japan

Clause 14 of the treaty stated that Japan would enter into negotiations with the Allied nations whose territories were occupied and suffered damage by Japanese forces, with a view to Japan compensating those countries for the damage.

Accordingly, the Philippines and South Vietnam received compensation in 1956 and 1959 respectively. Burma and Indonesia were not original signatories, but they later signed bilateral treaties in accordance with clause 14 of the San Francisco Treaty.

The last payment was made to the Philippines on 22 July 1976.

Debate in Japan

From a fringe topic to an open debate

Until the 1970s, Japanese war crimes were considered a fringe topic in the media. In the Japanese media, the opinions of the political center and left tend to dominate the editorials of newspapers, while the right tend to dominate magazines. Debates regarding war crimes were confined largely to the editorials of tabloid magazines where calls for the overthrow of "Imperialist America" and revived veneration of the Emperor coexisted with pornography.

In 1972, to commemorate the normalisation of relationship with China, Asahi Shimbun, a major liberal newspaper, ran a series on Japanese war crimes in China including the Nanjing massacre. This opened the floodgates to debates which have continued ever since. The 1990s are generally considered to be the period in which such issues become truly mainstream, and incidents such as the Nanking Massacre, Yasukuni Shrine, comfort women, the accuracy of school history textbooks, and the validity of the Tokyo Trials were debated, even on television.

As the consensus of Japanese jurists is that Japanese forces did not technically commit violations of international law, many right wing elements in Japan have taken this to mean that war crimes trials were examples of victor's justice.

This interpretation is vigorously contested by Japanese peace groups and the political left. In the past, these groups have tended to argue that the trials hold some validity, either under the Geneva Convention (even though Japan hadn't signed it), or under an undefined concept of international law or consensus. Alternatively, they have argued that, although the trials may not have been technically valid, they were still just, somewhat in line with popular opinion in the West and in the rest of Asia.

By the early 21st century, the revived interest in Japan's imperial past had brought new interpretations from a group which has been labelled both "new right" and "new left". This group points out that many acts committed by Japanese forces, including the Nanjing Incident, were violations of the Japanese military code. It is suggested that had war crimes tribunals been conducted by the post-war Japanese government, in strict accordance with Japanese military law, many of those who were accused would still have been convicted and executed. Therefore, the moral and legal failures in question were the fault of the Japanese military and the government, for not executing their constitutionally defined duty.

The new right/new left also takes the view that the Allies committed no war crimes against Japan, because Japan was not a signatory to the Geneva Convention, and as a victors, the Allies had every right to demand some form of retribution, to which Japan consented in various treaties.

Under the same logic, the new right/new left considers the killing of Chinese who were suspected of guerrilla activity to be perfectly legal and valid, including some of those killed at Nanjing, for example. They also take the view that many Chinese civilian casualties resulted from the scorched earth tactics of the Chinese nationalists. Though such tactics are arguably legal, the new right/new left takes the position that some of the civilian deaths caused by these scorched earth tactics are wrongly attributed to the Japanese military.

Similarly, they take the position that those who have attempted to sue the Japanese government for compensation have no legal or moral case.

The new right and new left also take a less sympathetic view of Korean claims of victimhood, because prior to annexation by Japan, Korea was a tributary of the Qing dynasty and, according to them, the Japanese colonisation, though undoubtedly harsh, was "better" than the previous rule in terms of human rights and economic development.

They also argue that the Kantōgun (also known as the Kwantung Army) was at least partly culpable. Although the Kantōgun was nominally subordinate to the Japanese high command at the time, its leadership demonstrated significant self-determination, as shown by its involvement in the plot to assassinate Zhang Zuolin in 1928, and the Manchurian Incident of 1931, which led to the foundation of Manchukuo in 1932. Moreover, at that time, it was the official policy of the Japanese high command to confine the conflict to Manchuria. But in defiance of the high command, the Kantōgun invaded China proper, under the pretext of the Marco Polo Bridge Incident. The Japanese government not only failed to court martial the officers responsible for these incidents, but it also accepted the war against China, and many of those who were involved were even promoted. (Some of the officers involved in the Nanking Massacre were also promoted.)

Whether or not Hirohito himself bears any responsibility for such failures is a sticking point between the new right and new left. Officially, the imperial constitution, adopted under Emperor Meiji, gave full powers to the Emperor. Article 4 prescribed that "The Emperor is the head of the Empire, combining in Himself the rights of sovereignty, and exercises them, according to the provisions of the present Constitution" and article 11 prescribed that "The Emperor has the supreme command of the Army and the Navy".

For historian Akira Fujiwara, the thesis that the emperor as an organ of responsibility could not reverse cabinet decisions is a myth (shinwa) fabricated after the war. Others argue that Hirohito deliberately styled his rule in the manner of the British constitutional monarchy, and he always accepted the decisions and consensus reached by the high command. According to this position, the moral and political failure rests primarily with the Japanese High Command and the Cabinet, most of whom were later convicted at the Tokyo War Crimes Tribunal as class-A war criminals, absolving all members of the imperial family such as Prince Chichibu, Prince Yasuhiko Asaka, Prince Higashikuni, Prince Hiroyasu Fushimi and Prince Takeda.

Nippon Kaigi, the main negationist lobby

The denial of Japanese war crimes is one of the key missions of the openly negationist lobby Nippon Kaigi (Japan Conference), a nationalistic nonparty organisation that was established in 1997 and also advocates patriotic education, the revision of the constitution, and official visits to Yasukuni Shrine.Christian G. Winkler (2011). The quest for Japan's new constitution: an analysis of visions and constitutional reform proposals, 1980–2009, London; New York: Routledge, p. 75N. Onishi – New York Times, 17 December 2006, Japan Rightists Fan Fury Over North Korea Abductions Nippon Kaigi's members and affiliates include lawmakers, ministers, a few prime ministers, and the chief priests of prominent Shinto shrines. The chairman, Toru Miyoshi, is a former Chief Justice of the Supreme Court of Japan. Former Prime Minister of Japan, Shinzo Abe, was a member of the Nippon Kaigi.

Later investigations

As with investigations of Nazi war criminals, official investigations and inquiries are still ongoing. During the 1990s, the South Korean government started investigating some people who had allegedly become wealthy while collaborating with the Japanese military. In South Korea, it is also alleged that during the political climate of the Cold War, many such people or their associates or relatives were able to acquire influence with the wealth they had acquired collaborating with the Japanese and assisted in the covering-up, or non-investigation, of war crimes in order not to incriminate themselves. With the wealth they had amassed during the years of collaboration, they were able to further benefit their families by obtaining higher education for their relatives.

Further evidence has been discovered as a result of these investigations. It has been claimed that the Japanese government intentionally destroyed the reports on Korean comfort women. Some have cited Japanese inventory logs and employee sheets on the battlefield as evidence for this claim. For example, one of the names on the list was of a comfort woman who stated she was forced to be a prostitute by the Japanese. She was classified as a nurse along with at least a dozen other verified comfort women who were not nurses or secretaries. Currently, the South Korean government is looking into the hundreds of other names on these lists.

In 2011, it was alleged in an article published in the Japan Times newspaper by Jason Coskrey that the British government covered up a Japanese massacre of British and Dutch POWs to avoid straining the recently re-opened relationship with Japan, along with their belief that Japan needed to be a post-war bulwark against the spread of communism.

Tamaki Matsuoka's 2009 documentary Torn Memories of Nanjing includes interviews with Japanese veterans who admit to raping and killing Chinese civilians.

Concerns of the Japanese Imperial Family

Potentially in contrast to Prime Minister Abe's example of his Yasukuni Shrine visits, by February 2015, some concern within the Imperial House of Japan — which normally does not issue such statements – over the issue was voiced by then-Crown Prince Naruhito, who succeeded his father on 1 May 2019. Naruhito stated on his 55th birthday (23 February 2015) that it was "important to look back on the past humbly and correctly", in reference to Japan's role in World War II-era war crimes, and that he was concerned about the ongoing need to "correctly pass down tragic experiences and the history behind Japan to the generations who have no direct knowledge of the war, at the time memories of the war are about to fade". Two visits to the Yasukuni Shrine in the second half of 2016 by Japan's former foreign minister, Masahiro Imamura, were again followed by controversy that still showed potential for concern over how Japan's World War II history may be remembered by its citizens"Japan defence minister visits Yasukuni war shrine, one day after visiting Pearl Harbour with Abe", AFP via South China Morning Post, 29 December 2016. Retrieved 28 December 2016. as it entered the Reiwa era.

List of major crimes

 Andaman Islands occupation
 Balalae IslandMassacres Alexandra Hospital massacre
 Bangka Island massacre
 Changjiao massacre
 Gando massacre
 Homfreyganj massacre
 Kalagon massacre
 Laha massacre
 Manila massacre
 Nanking Massacre
 Palawan massacre
 Pantingan River massacre
 Parit Sulong massacre
 Pig-basket atrocity
 Pontianak Massacre
 Sook Ching massacre
 Tol Plantation massacre
 Wake Island massacre
 Units Unit 100
 Unit 516
 Unit 543
 Unit 731
 Unit 1644
 Unit 1855
 Unit 8604
 Unit 9420War crimes'''
 Bataan Death March
 Burma Railway
 Changteh chemical weapon attack
 Chichijima incident
 Comfort women
 Contest to kill 100 people using a sword
 Hell ships
 Kaimingye germ weapon attack
 Panjiayu tragedy
 Sandakan Death Marches
 Selarang Barracks incident
 Three Alls Policy
 War crimes in Manchukuo

See also

 Allied war crimes during World War II
 American cover-up of Japanese war crimes
 Anti-Japanese sentiment
 Anti-Japanese sentiment in China
 Anti-Japanese sentiment in Korea
 Anti-Japanese sentiment in the United States
 British war crimes
 Death march
 Genocide denial
 Genocide recognition politics
 Genocide studies
 German war crimes
 Myth of the clean Wehrmacht
 War crimes of the Wehrmacht
 Hashima Island
 Italian war crimes
 List of Axis war crime trials
 List of war crimes committed during World War II
 Military history of Japan
 Nanjing Massacre denial
 Nazi human experimentation
 Philippine resistance against Japan
 Sōshi-kaimei
 Soviet war crimes
 Taiwanese Resistance to the Japanese Invasion (1895)
 United States war crimes
 Wartime sexual violence
Japanese movements
 Black Dragon Society
 Japanese nationalism
 Japanese settlers in Manchuria
 Manga Kenkanryu
 Political extremism in Japan
 Racism in Japan
 Tohokai – a Japanese fascist political party which advocated Nazism
 Uyoku dantai
 Zaitokukai
Agreements
 Japan-China Joint Declaration On Building a Partnership of Friendship and Cooperation for Peace and Development
 Joint Communique of the Government of Japan and the Government of the People's Republic of China

Notes

References

Sources

 
 
 
 Bix, Herbert. Hirohito and the Making of Modern Japan. New York: HarperCollins, 2000.
 - Compilation of interviews with Japanese survivors of World War II, including several who describe war crimes that they were involved with.
 
 
 Dower, John W. Embracing Defeat: Japan in the Wake of World War II. New York: New Press, 1999.
 
 
 
 
 
 
 
 
 
 
 
 
 Ramsey, Edwin, and Stephen Rivele. (1990). Lieutenant Ramsey's War. Knightsbridge Publishing Co., New York. ASIN: B000IC3PDE
 Schmidt, Larry. (1982). American Involvement in the Filipino Resistance on Mindanao During the Japanese Occupation, 1942–1945. (PDF). M.S. Thesis. U.S. Army Command and General Staff College. 274 pp.
 
 
 
 
 Cheung, Raymond. OSPREY AIRCRAFT OF THE ACES 126: Aces of the Republic of China Air Force. Oxford: Osprey Publishing, 2015. .
 
 
 

Further reading

 Barnaby, Wendy. The Plague Makers: The Secret World of Biological Warfare, Frog Ltd, 1999.    
 Bass, Gary Jonathan. Stay the Hand of Vengeance: The Politics of War Crimes Trials. Princeton, NJ: Princeton University Press, 2000.
 Bayly, C. A. & Harper T. Forgotten Armies. The Fall of British Asia 1941-5 (London: Allen Lane) 2004
 Bergamini, David. Japan's Imperial Conspiracy, William Morrow, New York, 1971.
 Brackman, Arnold C.: The Other Nuremberg: the Untold Story of the Tokyo War Crimes Trial. New York: William Morrow and Company, 1987. 
 
 Endicott, Stephen and Edward Hagerman. The United States and Biological Warfare: Secrets from the Early Cold War and Korea, Indiana University Press, 1999. 
 
 
 Gold, Hal. Unit 731 Testimony, Charles E Tuttle Co., 1996. 
 Handelman, Stephen and Ken Alibek. Biohazard: The Chilling True Story of the Largest Covert Biological Weapons Program in the World—Told from Inside by the Man Who Ran It, Random House, 1999.  
 
 Harris, Robert and Jeremy Paxman. A Higher Form of Killing: The Secret History of Chemical and Biological Warfare, Random House, 2002. 
 Harris, Sheldon H. Factories of Death: Japanese Biological Warfare 1932–45 and the American Cover-Up, Routledge, 1994.  
 
 
 Horowitz, Solis. "The Tokyo Trial" International Conciliation 465 (November 1950), 473–584.
 
 
 Latimer, Jon, Burma: The Forgotten War, London: John Murray, 2004. 
 
 Lingen, Kerstin von, ed. War Crimes Trials in the Wake of Decolonization and Cold War in Asia, 1945-1956. (Palgrave Macmillan, Cham, 2016) online
 
 
 Neier, Aryeh. War Crimes: Brutality, Genocide, Terror and the Struggle for Justice, Times Books, Random House, New York, 1998.
 O'Hanlon, Michael E..  The Senkaku Paradox: Risking Great Power War Over Small Stakes (Brookings Institution, 2019) online review
 
 Rees, Laurence. Horror in the East, published 2001 by the British Broadcasting Company
 Seagrave, Sterling & Peggy. Gold Warriors: America's secret recovery of Yamashita's gold. Verso Books, 2003. 
  Detailed account of the International Military Tribunal for the Far East proceedings in Tokyo
 Trefalt, Beatrice . "Japanese War Criminals in Indochina and the French Pursuit of Justice: Local and International Constraints." Journal of Contemporary History 49.4 (2014): 727–742.
 
 Williams, Peter. Unit 731: Japan's Secret Biological Warfare in World War II, Free Press, 1989. 
 
  A rebuttal to Iris Chang's book on the Nanking massacre.

Audio/visual media

 Minoru Matsui (2001), Japanese Devils, a documentary which is based on interviews which were conducted with veteran soldiers of the Imperial Japanese Army (Japanese Devils sheds light on a dark past) CNN
 Japanese Devils, Midnight Eye,
 

External links

 Battling Bastards of Bataan
 "Biochemical Warfare – Unit 731". Alliance for Preserving the Truth of Sino-Japanese War. No date.
 "Cannibalism". Dan Ford, "Japan at War, 1931–1945" September 2007.
 "Confessions of Japanese war criminals". No date.
 "History of Japan's biological weapons program" Federation of American Scientists, 2000-04-16
 Ji Man-Won's website (in Korean) Various dates.
 Justin McCurry, "Japan's sins of the past" in The Guardian, 2004-10-28
 Nazi War Crimes and Japanese Imperial Government Records Interagency Working Group (IWG)  U.S. National Archives and Records Administration (NARA). No date.
 "The Other Holocaust" No date.
 "Rape of Queen MIN" 2002
 R.J. Rummel, "Statistics Of Japanese Democide: Estimates, Calculations, And Sources"  University of Hawaii, 2002
 Shane Green. "The Asian Auschwitz of Unit 731"  in The Age, 2002-08-29
 "Statement by Prime Minister Tomiichi Murayama" 1995-08-15
  in U.S. News & World Report'' 1995-07-31
 Japanese Treatment of World War II POWs

 
Anti-Chinese sentiment in Japan
Anti-Korean sentiment in Japan
Genocides in Asia
Genocides in Oceania-Pacific
Historical negationism
History of Asia
War
Imperial Japanese Army
Imperial Japanese Navy
Incidents of cannibalism
Japanese imperialism and colonialism
Military history of Japan
Shōwa Statism
War crimes committed by country